Since being founded in 1975, the European Nuclear Society (ENS) has grown to become the largest society in Europe for science, engineering and research in support of the nuclear industry. ENS’s membership consists of national nuclear societies from 22 European countries, plus Israel. Within the membership there are also stakeholder representatives for nuclear technology and research businesses, with around 60 corporate members. 
ENS exists to promote the advancement of peaceful uses of nuclear energy on an international level, encouraging networking between countries and facilitating meetings to support global communication on scientific and technical affairs. ENS also supports education and training in engineering, promotes international standardisation in the nuclear industry, coordinates the activities of the member organisations and develops the expertise and capability needed for the future of the industry. 
One of ENS’s activities is organising conferences and workshops, providing a platform for international forums to exchange knowledge, experience, ideas and scientific developments.

The current president of the European Nuclear Society is Noël Camarcat.

The ENS is member of the International Nuclear Societies Council (INSC).

ENS Young Generation Network (YGN)
The ENS Young Generation Network (YGN) has been active across the society’s member countries since 1995 when ENS supported a proposal from Jan Runermark, the then President-elect of ENS, to spread the Young Generation Network (YGN) to all its member countries.  Five objectives ensure that YGN members are working towards a common goal, these are:
Attracting more young people: Recruiting and educating young people to be skilled members of the nuclear industry
Training new leaders: Exchanging knowledge between generations
Thinking nationally: Participation of young people in the national nuclear societies
Thinking internationally: Bringing together all national YGNs at European level
Opening up nuclear conferences: Ensuring events are relevant and topical for young people to attend.

YGN membership is available to anybody working in the nuclear industry, as well as fields of nuclear academia and research.

European Nuclear Young Generation Forum (ENYGF)
The European Nuclear Young Generation Forum (ENYGF) is a biennial international event, held since 2005 by the Young Generation Network (YGN) as part of the European Nuclear Society.  The forum alternates with the International Youth Nuclear Congress (IYNC) and is held in a different location in Europe each time.

The aim of the event is to provide a platform for learning and networking for young professionals in all areas of nuclear application. It provides a chance to enhance international communication as well as sharing technical advances and knowledge, learning from experience and discussing best practice as well as considering social and political aspects of the nuclear industry.

The forum involves:
Formal lectures and presentations
Workshops - which have previously included Women in Nuclear (WiN) 
Technical tours
Keynote speakers 
Social and cultural events

Each forum has a number of central focuses, around which the speakers, lectures, presentations and workshops are based. In 2011, the forum in Prague focused on the topics of nuclear safety and severe accidents, education and training, new build projects and ITER and fusion.  At the 2015 forum in Paris the main focus points were nuclear efficiency and nuclear and the environment.

Previous ENYGF events

Following the success of IYNC conferences which began in the year 2000, the ENS-YGN decided to create the ENYGF 2005 and host the inaugural event in the city Zagreb, Croatia. Following this, the ENS-YGN elected cities to host the event every two years, the host locations to date have been:
ENYGF 2007, Amsterdam, Netherlands 
ENYGF 2009, Córdoba, Spain 
ENYGF 2011, Prague, Czech Republic 
ENYGF 2013, Stockholm, Sweden. With 300 participants where the previous record was 150
ENYGF 2015, Paris, France

The events are organized by an executive committee from the selected country. This executive committee can acquire assistance from delegates of other countries who chose to collaborate. All the committee members have a common goal which is to further the ENS-YGN mission and help to create a global community of nuclear professionals.

See also
American Nuclear Society
European Atomic Forum
Institute of Nuclear Materials Management
Nuclear Institute

References

International nuclear energy organizations
International scientific organizations based in Europe
Nuclear organizations
Nuclear power in Belgium
Organisations based in Brussels